Silimo, also Wulik or South Ngalik, is a Papuan language of the Indonesian New Guinea Highlands.

References

Dani languages